National Secondary Route 114, or just Route 114 (or ) is a National Road Route of Costa Rica, located in the Heredia province.

Description
In Heredia province the route covers Barva canton (San Pablo, San José de la Montaña districts), Santa Bárbara canton (Jesús district).

References

Highways in Costa Rica